Bafilo is a city in Togo south of Kara and north of Sokode in Tchaoudjo Region. 

It is known for its large mosque, wagasi cheese, its weaving industry and the nearby Bafilo Falls.

History

World War I
During World War I, a skirmish took place in Bafilo between French and German troops in on 13 August 1914. French forces first crossed the border between French Dahomey and German Togoland on 8 or 9 of August 1914. French units in north-eastern Togoland came into contact with German ones on 13 August in the districts of Sansane-Mangu and Sokode-Balfilo. After some light fighting, the French company retreated after facing resistance stronger than they had expected.

Although this was  technically a victory for German forces, it did little to stall the Allied advance and by the end of August the colony was surrendered to the Allies.

Notable people
 

Abdou Ouro-Akpo (born 1982), former international footballer

References

Bibliography
 

Populated places in Kara Region
Cantons of Togo